Before the Act of Union 1707, the barons of the shire or sheriffdom of Caithness elected commissioners to represent them in the unicameral Parliament of Scotland and in the Convention of Estates. After 1708, Caithness alternated with Buteshire in returning one member the House of Commons of Great Britain and later to the House of Commons of the United Kingdom.

List of shire commissioners

 1648: Laird of Sandsyde (Innes) 
 1649–50: Sir John Sinclair of Dunbeath
 1661: James Sinclair of Murkill 
 1661–63: William Sinclair of Latheron and Dunbeath
 1665 convention: James Innes of Sandsyde 
1667 convention, 1669–74: no representation
 1678 convention: William Dunbar of Hempriggs
 1678 convention: John Sinclair of Ulbster 
 1681–82: George Sinclair of Bilbster 
 1685–86, 1702-05: Sir George Sinclair of Clyth (died c.1705) 
 1689–93: James Sinclair of Freswick (died c.1693) 
 1693–95: Alexander Manson of Bridgend 
 1695–1701: Patrick Murray of Pennyland 
 1703–07: Sir James Sinclair of Dunbeath
 1706–07: Sir James Dunbar of Hempriggs

References

See also
 List of constituencies in the Parliament of Scotland at the time of the Union

Constituencies of the Parliament of Scotland (to 1707)
Constituencies disestablished in 1707
1707 disestablishments in Scotland
Politics of the county of Caithness